Kerry Mortimer (born 30 July 1955 in Adelaide, South Australia) is an Australian former cricket player. Mortimer played one Women's One Day International for the Australia women's national cricket team.

References

External links
 Kerry Mortimer at CricketArchive
 Kerry Mortimer at southernstars.org.au

Living people
1955 births
Australia women One Day International cricketers
Cricketers from Adelaide